Munro Chambers (born July 29, 1990) is a Canadian actor who is best known for his roles as Wilder on The Latest Buzz (2007–2010), Elijah "Eli" Goldsworthy on Degrassi (2010–2015), Frankie Chandler on Lockwood (2016–present) and Nate on Second Jen (2016).

Personal life
Chambers is related to both Colin Mochrie and Debra McGrath.  In a 2010 interview, he stated:

"I could say many things... my uncle, for one thing, is Colin Mochrie. He's been my inspiration getting into the industry. He's my uncle-in-law; his wife is my dad's cousin. My dad and his cousin, they were kind of like brother and sister growing up, so he’s my uncle by law. We have a good relationship."

Filmography

Film

Television

Video games

References

External links
 

1990 births
Living people
Franco-Ontarian people
Canadian male television actors
Canadian male child actors
Identical twin male actors
Male actors from Ontario
People from Ajax, Ontario
Canadian twins
20th-century Canadian male actors
21st-century Canadian male actors